Zambara is a village in Ntchisi District in the Central Region of Malawi. Ntchisi Forest Reserve lies to the east.

References

External links
Maplandia

Populated places in Central Region, Malawi